The Algodoal-Maiandeua Environmental Protection Area is an environmental protection area in the state of Pará, Brazil. It protects two coastal islands with beaches, dunes, mangroves and wetlands that are home to fishing people and are popular with tourists.

Location
 
The Algodoal-Maiandeua Environmental Protection Area is in the municipality of Maracanã, Pará.
It is on the northeast coast of Pará in the Salgado microregion.
The Atlantic Ocean is to the north and the Mocooca channel to the south. 
The Maracanã River estuary is to the east and the Marapanim River estuary to the west.
The APA is bounded to the south by the Maracanã Marine Extractive Reserve.
The Mestre Lucindo Marine Extractive Reserve is opposite the APA to the west.

Algodoal Island has  and contains Algodoal village, Princesa Beach, Farol Beach and areas of mangroves, restingas and dunes.
The island and the largest village are named "Algodoal" after a native plant, the algodão de seda.
Maiandeua island has  and holds the villages of Fortalezinha, Mocooca and Camboinha, the localities of Camaleão, Passagem and Pedra Chorona, and beaches, mangroves and terra firme areas with vegetation.
The villages are separated by areas of mangroves and tidal channels.

The village of Algodoal can be reached by boat from the port of Marudá, a journey of about 40 minutes depending on the tide.
A boat from the municipality of Maracanã can cross the Mocooca channel to the village of Mocooca in 5 minutes.

History

Fishermen from whom the present inhabitants are descended seem to have first moved to the island of Algodoal in the 1920s.

The management council was created by decree 291 of 6 June 2006.
On 1 June 2007 regulations were passed that prohibited use of motor vehicles in the APA.
Preparation of a management plan was approved on 21 September 2011.
The management plan was published on 31 December 2012, although it was not made official through an ordinance.

Environment

The APA is in the Amazon biome.
There is most rain from January to March, and a dry season from September to December.
The island has beaches, mangroves, freshwater lakes, dunes and streams.
Vegetation is typical of restinga, with great variety of species.
The mangroves act as nurseries for fish, mussels, shrimps, oysters, turtles, crabs and other marine species.
In the dunes and surroundings there are typical fruits such as ajuru, cashew, coconut, murucí, carambola and mango.

Common bird species include guará, garça, pavão, socó, taquerê, gavião caranguejeiro, caracaraí, cebinho do mangue, yellow-crowned night heron, Platalea ajaja, garganey, parrots, collared plover, sanderling, Hudsonian whimbrel and ruddy turnstone.
Common fish include pescada amarela, xaréu, tainha, anchova, corvina, gó, cação, mero, Aspistor luniscutis, dourada, pratiqueira, serra and robalo.
Molluscs and crustaceans include oysters, mussels, turu, sururu, shrimp and crabs.
Other fauna include sloths, quatis, anteaters, foxes, gatos maracajá, chameleons, mucuras, various species of monkey, racoons, alligators, jabutis and tartarugas.

Tourism

The island receives large numbers of tourists, including Brazilian and foreign visitors, who stay in inns and hotels.
The residents organize tours and fishing trips.
The APA has high tourism potential due to its scenic beauty and variety of ecosystems, beaches, dunes, cliffs, mangroves and trails linking the villages. They villagers sell local handicrafts produced from the regional flora, and practice traditional ways of making cassava flour, music, the carimbó praiano dance, local cooking and artisanal fishing.

Notes

Sources

Further reading

 Kaufmann, Götz. 2012. “Environmental Inequality Patterns on the Island of Algodoal-Maiandeua. A Q Methodological Case Study.” In Geographies of Inequality in Latin America, eds. Geographischen Institut der Universität Kiel, Rainer Wehrhahn, and Verena Sandner Le Gall. Kiel, 263–96.
 Kaufmann, Götz. 2013. Environmental Justice and Sustainable Development. With a Case Study in Brazil’s Amazon Using Q Methodology. 3rd ed. Saarbrücken: Südwestdeutscher Verlag für Hochschulschriften. download for free on: https://refubium.fu-berlin.de/discover?filtertype_0=mycoreId&filter_relational_operator_0=equals&filter_0=FUDISS_thesis_000000038744
 Kaufmann, Götz. 2014. “Seeking Environmental Injustice with Help of Q Methodology on APA Algodoal-Maiandeua.” Environmental Justice 7(3).
 Kaufmann, Götz. 2003. “Wandel Durch Annäherung. Die Monetäre Strukturrevolution Im Zeitalter Der Globalisierung Am Beispiel von Ilha de Algodoal / Maiandeua.” (in German). Diplomarbeit, Freie Universität Berlin. http://edocs.fu-berlin.de/docs/receive/FUDOCS_document_000000012784.

Environmental protection areas of Brazil
Protected areas established in 1990
1990 establishments in Brazil
Protected areas of Pará